Megalogomphus superbus, is a species of dragonfly in the family Gomphidae. It is known only from the Western Ghats of India.

Description and habitat
It is a large dragonfly with bottle-green eyes. Its thorax is velvet-black marked with tender-foliage green. Segment 1 of the abdomen is black with lower part of sides and middle of apical border dorsally pale grass-green. Segment 2 is black with a mid-dorsal stripe bordered with yellow or grass-green. Segment 3 is with a narrow mid-dorsal stripe in green to yellow. The apical
third of the segment is black, the medial third except on mid-dorsum bright reddish-brown. Segments 4 to 6 are similar to 3; but the middle third of all segments is entirely reddish-brown. Segment 7 has basal two-thirds citron-yellow and apical third black. Segment 8 is dark reddish-brown changing to black on dorsum. Segment 9 is similar but with the lateral spot much larger and brighter yellow. Segment 10 is reddish-brown. Anal appendages are reddish-brown, paler at base.

It differs from Megalogomphus hannyngtoni by the red medial markings of abdominal segments 3 to 6, by the occiput being
yellow instead of black and the face less black, and by the presence of a humeral stripes.

This dragonfly perches on twigs, shrubs, and boulders in hill streams. It breeds in fast flowing forested hill streams.

See also
 List of odonates of India
 List of odonata of Kerala

References

Gomphidae
Taxa named by Frederic Charles Fraser